The Northside Hospital System (Northside) is a network of hospitals and medical facilities in Georgia, United States. Its specialties include oncology, gynecology, neurology, orthopedic surgery and gastroenterology.

History
Northside Hospital purchased Baptist Medical Center in Cumming, Georgia in 2002, which was renamed Northside Hospital-Forsyth. Northside Hospital-Midtown opened in Atlanta in November 2018.

References

External links
 Official website

Sandy Springs, Georgia
Hospitals in Georgia (U.S. state)
Hospital buildings completed in 2018